The Somali calendar, which is a moon-and-sun-based system, was used by herders and farmers to determine the seasons and predict the weather. The Somali lunar calendar is known as dayax-tiriska and the sun-based calendar is called amin-tiris or shin-tiris.

References

 "Orthodox" Muslims in Somalia disapproved of the Dabshid feast (Barile, La colonizzazione fascista, p.128) * at Google Books
 Said M-Shidad Hussein, The Somali Calendar: An Ancient, Accurate Timekeeping System.*Somali calendar at Wardheer.startlogic.com

Somali culture
Specific calendars
Time in Somalia